Sarah Daniels is an American actress, singer, and Twitch streamer.

Early life
Sarah Daniels was born in Tallahassee, Florida to John and Adrienne and has one older sister Alyssa. Daniels grew up in Celebration, Florida where from the age of three she was enrolled into dance lessons which she continues with today.  At the age of 12, Daniels was offered her first national tour in "Bear in the Big Blue House Live", which was a nine-month tour of the eastern and southern United States.

Personal life
Daniels is an avid gamer and is a full-time streamer on the service Twitch.
Daniels recently opened up about her battle with a long term eating disorder at the hands of Walt Disney World in a five-page article in The Indianapolis Star
In October 2017, Daniels became engaged to fellow actor Skye Scott. In September 2018, the pair married in a private ceremony, however as of December 2019, they are divorced.  Daniels announced she had married Christopher Barrett on May 10, 2020 in a private ceremony, on her Twitter account. Barrett is a Game Director for Bungie's video games Destiny and Destiny 2.

Career

Daniels is currently a full-time gaming streamer on Twitch.tv, and she is represented in esports and branded lifestyle by Alex Robles at Buchwald.

Daniels started to perform at The Walt Disney Resort from the age of sixteen and has performed in shows all over the United States throughout her career.

She played the lead role of Elle Woods in "Legally Blonde: The Musical" at the Fireside Theatre and has performed in "Merrily We Roll Along" directed by Broadway's Michael Arden.

As of December 2017, her most recent role was in the stage production of Mamma Mia at the Phoenix Theatre in Phoenix, Arizona, where she played the character of Sophie Sheridan. She reprised her role as Sophie in a new production of Mamma Mia! performing at the Arkansas Repertory Theatre from March 2018.

In May 2018 she appeared in the stage production of Grease at the Toronto Winter Garden Theatre as the Sandy alternate and later replaced Janel Parrish in the lead role of Sandy.

In February 2019, she appeared as Sandy in the stage production of Grease at the Beef and Boards Theater., where she subsequently was offered the role of Ariel in The Little Mermaid, as well as Amber in Hairspray.

Film

TV

Theatre

References

External links

Living people
Actresses from Tallahassee, Florida
American women pop singers
American women singer-songwriters
American feminists
American film actresses
American television actresses
American voice actresses
Feminist musicians
Guitarists from Florida
Musicians from Tallahassee, Florida
Singer-songwriters from Florida
21st-century American actresses
21st-century American women guitarists
21st-century American guitarists
21st-century American women singers
21st-century American singers
Year of birth missing (living people)